Joseph-Michel Dutens (15 October 1765 in Tours, France – 6 August 1848) was a French engineer and political economist.

He was a nephew of Louis Dutens.

He worked as a designer on the La Tranchasse Canal Bridge, and as an engineer on the Berry Canal in 1841.

Works
 Philosophie de l'économle politique (Paris 1835, 2 volumes)

References

French civil engineers
1765 births
1848 deaths